The Robert A. Taft Memorial and Carillon is a carillon dedicated as a memorial to U.S. Senator Robert Alphonso Taft, son of President William Howard Taft.

The memorial is located north of the Capitol, on Constitution Avenue between New Jersey Avenue and First Street, N.W. Designed by architect Douglas W. Orr, the memorial consists of a Tennessee marble tower and a  bronze statue of Senator Taft sculpted by Wheeler Williams. Above the statue is inscribed, "This Memorial to Robert A. Taft, presented by the people to the Congress of the United States, stands as a tribute to the honesty, indomitable courage, and high principles of free government symbolized by his life." Jets of water flow into a basin that rings the base.

The twenty-seven bells in the upper part of the tower were cast in the Paccard Foundry in Annecy-le-Vieux, France. The largest, or bourdon bell, weighs 7 tons (6350 kg). At the dedication ceremony on April 14, 1959, former President Herbert Hoover stated, "When these great bells ring out, it will be a summons to integrity and courage." The large central bell strikes on the hour, while the smaller fixed bells chime on the quarter-hour. By resolution of Congress, they play "The Star-Spangled Banner" at 2 p.m. on the Fourth of July.

It was funded by popular subscription from every state in the nation. More than a million dollars were collected.

Engraving 
"This memorial to Robert A. Taft, presented by the people to the Congress of the United States, stands as a tribute to the honesty, indomitable courage, and high principles of free government symbolized by his life."

"If we wish to make democracy permanent in this country, let us abide by the fundamental principles laid down in the Constitution. Let us see that the state is the servant of its people, and that the people are not the servants of the state."

See also
 List of public art in Washington, D.C., Ward 6

References 

 The Robert A. Taft Memorial and Carillon, Architect of the Capitol
 April 14, 1959: Taft Bell Tower Dedicated, United States Senate Historical Minutes
 photo of engraving of south facade

Specific

1959 establishments in Washington, D.C.
1959 sculptures
Bell towers in the United States
Bronze sculptures in Washington, D.C.
Buildings and structures completed in 1959
Carillons
Monuments and memorials in Washington, D.C.
Capitol Hill
Outdoor sculptures in Washington, D.C.
Towers completed in 1959
Towers in Washington, D.C.
United States Capitol grounds